The Manchukuo yuan (Mǎnzhōuguóyuán) was the official unit of currency of the Empire of Manchuria, from June 1932 to August 1945.

The monetary unit was based on one basic pure silver patron of 23.91 grams. It replaced the Chinese Haikwan tael, the local monetary system in common and regular use in Manchuria before the Mukden Incident, as legal tender.

History 

Initially banknotes and coins were produced and minted by the Bank of Japan, but were later issued from the mint of the Central Bank of Manchou in the Manchukuo capital of Hsinking (now Changchun) with branch offices in Harbin, Mukden, Kirin (Jilin), and Tsitsihar. The Central Bank of Manchou was opened on 1 July 1932 with a ceremony attended by the Emperor of Manchukuo in person, the new central bank acquired the assets and continued the responsibilities of the previous four banknote issuing banks in the region of Manchuria.

The currency that circulated in Manchuria prior to the introduction of the Manchukuo yuan consisted of the banknotes of various provincial banks as well as commercial banks, silver smelting shops (known as yinchang), and pawn shops. Types of old banknotes recovered and later destroyed included high denomination banknotes, banknotes denominated in copper coins, official provincial notes issued by the banks of the provincial government, small denomination coin notes, tiao/diào denominated notes, Chiao/jiǎo denominated notes and others. The 15 different types of currency that circulated in Manchuria prior to the introduction of the Manchukuo yuan were allowed to be exchanged for the new currency by degree for a period of three years, using this method ninety-five point four percent of all previous Manchurian currency that was still in circulation, and the destruction of these old banknotes was handled by officials from the Department of Finance of the government of Manchukuo. The old banknotes were first shredded by machines and then burned, but the number of banknotes that had to be destroyed proved so numerous and new hearths would have to be constructed to burn all the old paper money.

Due to worldwide fluctuations in the price of silver during the 1930s, Manchukuo took the yuan off the silver standard in 1935 and subsequently pegged the yuan to, and later reached approximate exchange parity with, the Japanese yen. In 1940 the Manchukuo yuan was being used to measure Manchukuo exports and imports to countries that included America, Germany and Japan.

Throughout this period about half the value of the issued notes was backed by specie reserves. The notes issued were in five denominations, one hundred, ten, five and one yuan and five chiao (one-half yuan), and typically depicted Qing dynasty rulers of China on the obverse. To keep up with the inflationary pressures typically experienced by Japanese-controlled areas towards the end of World War II, a 1,000 yuan note was issued in 1944.

The Yuan was subdivided into 10 chiao (角), 100 fen (分) or 1000 li (釐). Coins were issued in denominations of 5 li up to 10 fen.

In 1944 and 1945, Manchukuo issued coins (1 and 5 fen) made of what the Standard Catalog of World Coins describes as "red or brown fiber", resembling cardboard. These are a rare example of non-metallic coins.

As a matter of policy, the United States prevented any trading in the currency. This made it more difficult for the nation to access the American credit market.

In 1948, after the end of World War II, approximately 12 billion yuan of Central Bank of Manchou notes were redeemed by the Tung Pei Bank.

Banknotes 

Initially banknotes were printed by the Japanese but also by the Manchu Imperial Printing Bureau after the old Chinese mint in the city of Mukden was repaired.

Coins

See also 

 Central Bank of Manchou 
 Paper money of the Qing dynasty 
 Qing dynasty coinage

References 

Currencies of China
Modern obsolete currencies
Currencies introduced in 1932
1945 disestablishments in China
Economy of Manchukuo
Chinese numismatics